Divine Nagar railway station (Station Code: DINR)  falls between  and Koratty railway station in the busy Shoranur–Cochin Harbour section in Thrissur district, Kerala, India. This railway station is cared for by a divine retreat center. On weekends most of the trains stop there.

Administration 
Divine Nagar railway station is operated by the Chennai-headquartered Southern Railway zone of the Indian Railways. This station is a HG-1 class station under the Thiruvananthapuram railway division.

Services 
Five pairs of passenger trains halt at this station daily. Four pairs of express trains halt here on Fridays, Saturdays, and Sundays for the convenience of people travelling to the Divine Retreat Centre which is situated adjacent to the station. Express trains are the Venad Express, Parasuram Express, Netravati Express and Chennai–Alleppey Express.

References

Thiruvananthapuram railway division
Railway stations in Thrissur district